Sunshine is an unincorporated community in Ashley County, Arkansas, United States. The community is located along U.S. Route 165 and earlier the Missouri Pacific Railroad.

References

Unincorporated communities in Ashley County, Arkansas
Unincorporated communities in Arkansas